Foresight most commonly refers to:
 Foresight (psychology), the ability to predict or plan for the future
 Mental time travel or episodic foresight, the ability to reconstruct events from the past and imagine future events
 Precognition, a claimed psychic ability to see events in the future

Foresight or fore sight may also refer to:
 Foresight (forecasting journal), a publication on business forecasting, by the International Institute of Forecasters
 Foresight (futures studies), European planning mechanism for public policy
 Foresight (futures studies journal), an international bimonthly journal founded 1999
 Fore sight (surveying), short for "fore sight reading", a reading from a leveling staff when using a surveyor's level
 Foresight Institute, an American nonprofit organization studying molecular nanotechnology
 Foresight Linux, computer operating system
 Foresight magazine, a Japanese magazine published monthly by Shinchosha
 Chanting the Light of Foresight, a saxophone composition by Terry Riley
 Corporate foresight, a set of practices and capabilities of a firm
 HMS Foresight (H68), a 1934 Royal Navy F class destroyer during World War II

ar:استبصار